(The Painter in Love with his Model) is an opéra comique in two acts by the composer Egidio Duni with a libretto by Louis Anseaume. It was first performed at the Théâtre de la Foire Saint-Laurent in Paris on 26 July 1757. The Italian Duni had been working at the court of Parma, where French culture was highly fashionable, and travelled to Paris to see the premiere of his opera. He remained in France for the rest of his career. Le peintre marked an important stage in the development of opéra comique, since its musical numbers were almost entirely original music, whereas previous opéras comiques employed either popular vaudevilles or ariettes appropriated from other works.

The melody of "Maudit Amour, raison sévère", one of the opera's ariettes, was used by Sweden's bard, Carl Michael Bellman, for his song "Glimmande nymf", one of his Fredman's Epistles published in 1790.

Roles

References

External links
 1757 Libretto, in French, Gallica

Opéras comiques
French-language operas
Operas by Egidio Duni
Operas
1757 operas
Opera world premieres at the Opéra-Comique